Krasny Vostok is a rural locality (a village) in Meselinsky Selsoviet, Aurgazinsky District, Bashkortostan, Russia. The population was 43 as of 2010.

Geography 
Krasny Vostok is located 33 km south of Tolbazy (the district's administrative centre) by road. Kamenka is the nearest rural locality.

References 

Rural localities in Aurgazinsky District